Başkent University is a private university in Ankara, Turkey. The university was founded on 13 January 1994 by Professor Dr. Mehmet Haberal. The University center is located in Ankara and also has Medical and Research Centers and Dialysis Centers all around Turkey.

History
Başkent University, the first private university to teach health sciences in Turkey, was founded in 1993 with the cooperation of the Turkish Organ Transplant and Burns Treatment Foundation and the Haberal Education Foundation.

The university has developed and grown over the past eight years without governmental support. The construction of the buildings began on campus in 1995 and many other facilities have been added since then. Currently the university is considered one of Turkey's elite colleges in terms of its scientific approach in education.

On 19 May 2004, Baskent University started to broadcast TV channel, Kanal B. TV Channel studios and other facilities are located in the campus zone.

Faculties, departments and schools 
These faculties and schools are as follows:

 Faculty of Fine Arts, Design and Architecture
Visual Arts and Design (Graphic Design)
Interior Architecture and Environmental Design
Art History
Architecture
Fashion and Textile Design
 Faculty of Communications
Radio Television and Cinema
Public Relations
Communication Design
Knowledge Management
 Faculty of Dentistry
 Faculty of Economic and Administrative Sciences
Economics
Management
Political Science and International Relations
Tourism Management
Technology and Knowledge Management
 Faculty of Education
Computer and Instructional Technology Education
Foreign Language Education
Elemantry Education, Turkish Language Education
Psychological Counsealing and Educational Science Guidance
Secondary Education Science And Mathematics Fields Education
Secondary Education Social Fields Teaching Department
 Faculty of Engineering
Biomedical Engineering
Computer Engineering
Electrical-Electronics Engineering
Industrial Engineering
Mechanical Engineering
 Faculty of Health Sciences
Nutrition and Dietetics
Physical Therapy and Rehabilitation
Nursing and Health Services
Health Care Management
Sport Sciences
Social Work
 Faculty of Law
 Faculty of Medicine
 Faculty of Science and Letters
 Faculty of Commercial Sciences

Organizations and Institutions associated with the university
Centers
Mithat Coruh Quality Management Center
Center for Language Studies 
Center for Studies in Atatürk's Principles

Institutes
Institute of Educational Sciences 
Institute of Health Sciences 
Institute of Science 
Institute of Social Sciences
Institute of European Union and International Relations
Institute of Transplantation and Gene Sciences
Institute of Burn, Fire and Natural Disaster

Vocational Schools
Vocational School of Social Sciences
Vocational School of Technology
Vocational School of Health Sciences

Schools
Ayşeabla Schools
Adana Başkent Schools

Hospitals
Başkent University Ankara Hospital
Ayaş Physical Therapy and Rehabilitation Center
Yapracık Geriatric and Psychosocial Rehabilitation Center
Başkent University Adana Medical and Research Center
Başkent University İzmir Zübeyde Hanım Medical and Research Center
Başkent University Medical and Research Center of Alanya
Başkent University Konya Medical and Research Center
Başkent University Elmalık (Yalova) Dialysis Center
Başkent University İskenderun Dialysis Center
Başkent University İstanbul Dialysis Center
Başkent University Experimental Research Centers

Hotels
Patalya Thermal Resort Hotel
Patalya Lakeside Resort Hotel

See also 

 List of universities in Ankara 
 List of universities in Turkey
 Education in Turkey

References

External links
Başkent University
Faculty of Fine Arts, Design and Architecture
Library
English Language Depertmant
Kanal B (TV channel of Başkent University)

 
Universities and colleges in Turkey